The Central Jewish Bureau (CBŻ) was a Jewish autonomous section inside the Communist Party of Poland. The CBŻ was founded shortly after the Kombund had merged into the Communist Party in 1923. The role of the CBŻ was to mobilize support for the Communist Party amongst the Jewish community. However, not all Jewish party members were part of the CBŻ; assimilated Jewish communists were active in the main Polish party organization.

References

See also
Robotniczy Klub Sportowy „Skała"
Yevsektsia

Communist Party of Poland
Jewish Polish history
Jewish political parties
Jewish communist movements
Political parties of minorities in Poland
Secular Jewish culture in Europe